Portello is a station on Line 5 of the Milan Metro which opened on 6 June 2015.

History 
The works for the construction of the station began in July 2011, as part of the second section of the line, from Garibaldi FS to San Siro Stadio. It was opened to the public on 6 June 2015, one month after the opening of this section of the line.

Station structure 
Portello is an underground station with two tracks served by an island platform and like all the other stations on Line 5, is wheelchair accessible.

It is situated near Fieramilanocity, the urban headquarters of Fiera Milano, and the MiCo congress centre and the Citylife project.

Interchanges 
Near this station are located:
  Bus stop lines 47 and 78

References

Line 5 (Milan Metro) stations
Railway stations opened in 2015
2015 establishments in Italy
Railway stations in Italy opened in the 21st century